The White–Haines Building, also known as C. O. Haines Optical Company Building, is a historic building located at 82 North High Street in Downtown Columbus, Ohio. The building is part of the High and Gay Streets Historic District on the National Register of Historic Places.

The building has a concrete frame, glazed terra-cotta exterior in a grid of pilasters and horizontal spandrels. It is adorned in leaf motifs (trefoil or cloverleaf) and the north storefront that was once a jewelry store has detailed bronze-colored metal. It was built in 1913 and designed by Richards, McCarty & Bulford.

See also
 National Register of Historic Places listings in Columbus, Ohio

References

External links
 

Commercial buildings completed in 1913
1913 establishments in Ohio
Buildings in downtown Columbus, Ohio
National Register of Historic Places in Columbus, Ohio
Historic district contributing properties in Columbus, Ohio